Van Wagnen Airport  is a privately owned, public use airport located five nautical miles (6 mi, 9 km) west of the central business district of Napoleon, a community in Napoleon Township, Jackson County, Michigan, United States. It was formerly known as Day Field, owned by Janet Day.

Facilities and aircraft 
The airport covers an area of 10 acres (4 ha) at an elevation of 980 feet (299 m) above mean sea level. It has one runway designated 9/27 with a turf surface measuring 2,105 by 55 feet (642 x 17 m). For the 12-month period ending December 31, 2010, the airport had 50 general aviation aircraft operations.

References

External links 
 Aerial image as of April 1999 from USGS The National Map

Airports in Michigan
Buildings and structures in Jackson County, Michigan
Transportation in Jackson County, Michigan